The 2002 Northeast Conference baseball tournament began on May 17 and ended on May 19, 2002, at FirstEnergy Park in Lakewood, New Jersey.  The league's top four teams competed in the double elimination tournament.  Third-seeded  won their first of three consecutive tournament championships and earned the Northeast Conference's automatic bid to the 2002 NCAA Division I baseball tournament.

Seeding and format
The top four finishers were seeded one through four based on conference regular season winning percentage.

Bracket

Most Valuable Player
Kevin Rival of Central Connecticut was named Tournament Most Valuable Player.  Rival earned a win in the Blue Devils' opener against UMBC, and a save against Monmouth while also batting .300 with two doubles and three RBI for the tournament.

References

Tournament
Northeast Conference Baseball Tournament
Northeast Conference baseball tournament
Northeast Conference baseball tournament